Omnism is the respect of or belief in all religions with their gods or lack thereof. Those who hold this belief are called omnists, sometimes written as omniest. In recent years, the term has been resurfacing due to the interest of modern-day self-described omnists who have rediscovered and begun to redefine the term. Omnism is similar to syncretism, the belief in a fusion of faiths in harmony. However, it can also be seen as a way to accept the existence of various religions without believing in all that they profess to teach. Many omnists say that all religions contain truths, but that no one religion offers all that is truth.

Contemporary usage 
Contemporary usage has modified "belief in all religions" to refer more to an acceptance of the legitimacy of all religions. The Oxford English Dictionary elaborates that an omnist believes "in a single transcendent purpose or cause uniting all things or people". That is not necessarily the conclusion of those who describe themselves as omnists. Some omnists interpret this to mean that all religions contain varying elements of a common truth, or place omnism in opposition to dogmatism, in that omnists are open to potential truths from all religions. However, this does not mean that there is a single transcendent purpose or cause that unites. There may indeed be an infinite number of possibilities, or a deeper form of uncertainty in reality. There may be an influence more akin to existentialism in which consciousness is a power or force that helps determine the reality, yet is not a divine influence. 

The Oxford dictionary defines an omnist as "a person who believes in all faiths or creeds; a person who believes in a single transcendent purpose or cause uniting all things or people, or the members of a particular group of people". Edward Herbert, 1st Baron Herbert of Cherbury, considered the first Deist, argued that all religions were true. In the poem All Religions are One, William Blake professed that every religion originated from God's revelation. Unitarian Universalism, which grew out of the Protestant Reformation, practices Omnist beliefs. Other notable interfaith organizations include the Church for the Fellowship of All Peoples and the Tri-Faith Commons initiated by an Episcopal diocese which claims to be the only interfaith center with a temple, mosque and church. The Parliament of the World's Religions was the first organization with the goal to unite all religions.

In this regard, omnism does not appear to be a form of theology, as it neither espouses nor opposes particular beliefs about God. Instead, it affirms the necessity of one arriving at an understanding of reality based on personal experience, engagement, and inquiry, and an acceptance of the validity and legitimacy of the differing understandings of others.  In this, there is, however, an implied system of values or ethics.

Notable omnists 
 Philip James Bailey, who first coined the term.
 Ellen Burstyn, who affiliates herself with all religions, having stated that she is "a spirited opening to the truth that lives in all of these religions".
 John Coltrane, after a self-described religious experience that helped him kick his heroin and alcohol addictions, he became more deeply spiritual, later saying "I believe in all religions."
 Kyrie Irving, who stated that he is an omnist in response to condemnation of his promotion of the documentary Hebrews to Negroes: Wake Up Black America.
 Chris Martin, who referred to himself as an "all-theist", a term of his own coining referring to omnism.
 Shaquille O'Neal, who identifies himself as every religion since he doesn't want to exclude or alienate others of different faiths. He has stated that "You’re going to believe what you believe. The Muslim religion and all these religions have been around for thousands and thousands of years. So who am I to say, “Hey, don’t do this, don’t do that.” You believe what they believe, respect what they respect, and respect that person as a man or woman, and you’ll make it far in life. The fact is I’m Muslim, I’m Jewish, I’m Buddhist, I’m everybody ‘cause I’m a people person.

See also 
 Antireligion, the exact opposite position
 Bahá'í Faith
 Eclecticism
 Pandeism
 Perennial philosophy
 Religious pluralism
 Sheilaism
 Syncretism
 Universalism

General and cited references

Citations

External links 

 "Omnist", Oxford English Dictionary, draft revision June 2004, retrieved October 6, 2005.

Universalism